Camp WWE is an American adult animated short-form comedy series and program created and produced for the WWE Network by Seth Green's Stoopid Buddy Stoodios along with WWE and Film Roman, a Waterman Entertainment company. The show features the WWE roster as kids in a summer camp, with some of the alumni as counselors.

Voice cast

Vince McMahon as himself, Owner of Camp WWE
Ric Flair as himself, Head of Laundry and a counselor
Sgt. Slaughter as himself, Head of Security and a counselor
Lex Luger as himself, a bus driver
The Godfather as himself
Jake Roberts as himself, a mountain man who lives in the wilderness near Camp WWE
Ashley Bornancin as John Cena and The Rock
Aly Fainbarg as Stone Cold Steve Austin, Brie Bella, Nikki Bella, Stephanie McMahon, Paige
David Michael Brown as The Undertaker and Triple H
Dan Lippert as Big Show
Frank Lawson as R-Truth
Evan Michael Lee as Mark Henry
Brian Thompson as Bray Wyatt, Paul Bearer
Xander Mobus as The Ultimate Warrior

Vince McMahon, Sgt. Slaughter, Ric Flair, Jake "The Snake" Roberts and The Godfather are all voiced by their respective real-life counterparts, while Goldust is portrayed as being a mime-like silent character understood by other characters despite not speaking. The rest of the counselors (including The Ultimate Warrior, who died in 2014 while the series was in pre-production) are all voiced by regular voice actors, with Triple H providing the voice for his character's father "Quadruple H".

Production 
In 2013, WWE announced an animated series produced by WWE Studios and Film Roman Camp WWE

Episodes

Season 1
Five episode titles were announced April 2016:
Episode 1: "There’s No Place Like Camp" debuted May 1, 2016
Episode 2: "Not Without My Eyebrow" premiered May 9, 2016
Episode 3: "Survival Weekend" premiered May 16, 2016
Episode 4: "Vince Is Just Not That Into You" premiered May 22, 2016
Episode 5: "A Family McMahon" premiered May 26, 2016

Season 2
Episode 1 (6): “A Tale of Two Cenas” premiered May 6, 2018
Episode 2 (7): “The Ultimate Counselor” premiered May 13, 2018
Episode 3 (8): "Blackjack Beauty" premiered May 20, 2018
Episode 4 (9): "The Truth Hurts" premiered May 27, 2018
Episode 5 (10): "Deep Slaughter" premiered June 3, 2018

See also
Hulk Hogan's Rock 'n' Wrestling
WWE Slam City

References

External links
 
 

2016 web series debuts
2010s American animated television series
American adult animated comedy television series
American adult animated web series
Animation based on real people
Cultural depictions of The Undertaker
English-language television shows
WWE Network shows
Animated television series by WWE
Television series about summer camps